Daniel van Tonder (born 12 March 1991) is a South African professional golfer who plays on the European Tour and the Sunshine Tour.

Professional career
Van Tonder turned professional in 2011 and played on the Sunshine Tour. He has won seven times on the tour; including twice in 2014, at the Investec Royal Swazi Open and the Vodacom Origins of Golf at Euphoria. He also won the Mopani Redpath Greendoor Logistics Zambia Open in 2019. In 2020, he won 4 tournaments on the Sunshine Tour in the space of 3 months.

In March 2021, van Tonder claimed his first European Tour victory at the Kenya Savannah Classic. He defeated Jazz Janewattananond with a tap-in birdie on the third playoff hole. The following month he lost in a four-man playoff for the Limpopo Championship. In December 2021, van Tonder won the SA Open Championship; the Sunshine Tour's flagship event. He shot a final-round 65 to win by one shot ahead of Oliver Bekker.

Personal life
Van Tonder is married to Abigail who also acts as his caddie.

Professional wins (10)

European Tour wins (1)

European Tour playoff record (1–0)

Sunshine Tour wins (8)

Sunshine Tour playoff record (1–3)

IGT Pro Tour wins (1)

Results in major championships

"T" = tied

Results in World Golf Championships

1Cancelled due to COVID-19 pandemic

NT = No tournament
"T" = Tied

References

External links
 
 
 
 
 

South African male golfers
Sunshine Tour golfers
South African people of Danish descent
Afrikaner people
1991 births
Living people